"Blindfold" (also known as "Ten Little Girls") is the debut EP by English duo Curve. It was released on 4 March 1991 and it reached #68 in the UK singles chart. All four songs from the EP were included in the compilation Pubic Fruit, issued in 1992.

"Blindfold" was selected as Single of the Week by Melody Maker. It was also voted as the 5th Single of the Year by the same magazine.

Track listing

12" & CD
"Ten Little Girls" (feat. JC-001) – 4:27
"I Speak Your Every Word" – 3:53
"Blindfold" – 4:28
"No Escape From Heaven" – 4:19

7"
"Ten Little Girls" (feat. JC-001) – 4:27
"Blindfold" – 4:28

Music video
The video for "Ten Little Girls" features members of the band and the rapper JC-001 performing this song in a studio. It was filmed in black and white.

Credits
 Written by Toni Halliday and Dean Garcia
 Produced by Curve & Steve Osborne, except "Ten Little Girls" produced by Curve
 All tracks mixed by Alan Moulder at the Church
 Recorded at Tode by Curve
 Additional recording at Eastcote Productions
 Engineer: Ingo Vauk
 Mix Assistant: Darren Allison
 Rap written by JC 001
 Sleeve by Seddon & Curve
 Photograph by Barry Friedlander

References

1991 debut EPs
Curve (band) EPs